Mirificarma pallidipulchra is a moth of the family Gelechiidae. It is found in Algeria, Tunisia and Libya.

The wingspan is 6.5-8.5 mm for males and 6.5–8 mm for females. The head is cream to moderately light brown. The forewings have alternating transverse indistinct zig-zag patches of cream and ochre or occasionally deep yellowish brown. Adults are on wing from March to May and in July.

Adults have been found among stems and root-crowns of Teucrium species, but it is unlikely that this is the host plant.

References

Moths described in 1904
Mirificarma
Moths of Africa